Charles Richard Mead (April 9, 1921 – May 8, 2014) was a professional outfielder who played for the New York Giants of Major League Baseball (MLB) from 1943 to 1945. He stood 6'1½" and weighed 185 lbs. He was born in Vermilion, Alberta, Canada.

Mead is one of many ballplayers who only appeared in the major leagues during World War II. He made his major league debut on August 28, 1943 in a road game against the Boston Braves at Braves Field. His last game for New York was on September 30, 1945. He was released by the Giants on April 9, 1946, and never again returned to the major leagues. Mead's career totals include 87 games played, 64 hits, 3 home runs, 27 RBI, 18 runs, a .245 batting average, and a slugging percentage of .318. He was an average defensive outfielder for his era, handling 156 out of 160 total chances successfully for a fielding percentage of .975. One defensive highlight is that he participated in 6 double plays in just 71 outfield appearances.

External links 

Retrosheet
Death Notice

1921 births
2014 deaths
Azules de Veracruz players
Baseball people from Alberta
Calgary Stampeders players
Canadian expatriate baseball players in Mexico
Canadian expatriate baseball players in the United States
Henderson Oilers players
Hot Springs Bathers players
Jersey City Giants players
Lewiston Broncs players
Major League Baseball players from Canada
Major League Baseball right fielders
Major League Baseball second basemen
Memphis Chickasaws players
New York Giants (NL) players
Texarkana Twins players
Vancouver Capilanos players
Winston-Salem Twins players
Yakima Bears players